The 2017 Atlantic Coast Conference men's soccer season was the 64th season of men's varsity soccer in the conference.

The Wake Forest Demon Deacons and the North Carolina are the defending regular season champions for the Atlantic and Coastal Conferences, respectively.  Wake Forest are the defending ACC tournament champions.

Changes from 2016 

George Kiefer replaces Kelly Findley as the NC State Wolfpack head coach.

Teams

Stadiums and locations 

1.  Florida State, Georgia Tech and Miami do not sponsor men's soccer

Personnel

Preseason

Hermann Trophy
Prior to the season, 7 players were named to the Hermann Trophy watch list.

Tim Kübel – Louisville
Cam Lindley – North Carolina
Jon Gallagher – Notre Dame
Mo Adams – Syracuse
Edward Opoku – Virginia
Marcelo Acuna – Virginia Tech
Brad Dunwell – Wake Forest

Preseason poll
The 2017 ACC preseason poll was announced on August 16. Wake Forest and North Carolina were selected to win the Atlantic Division and Coastal Division, respectively. North Carolina was selected as the favorite to win the ACC championship.  The poll was voted on by all ACC coaches, for a total of 12 possible votes.

ACC championship votes

 North Carolina – 5
 Wake Forest – 3
 Clemson – 2
 Virginia – 1
 Notre Dame – 1

Regular season poll
Atlantic Division poll
 Wake Forest – 62 (8 first-place votes) 
 Clemson – 60 (3) 
 Louisville – 52 (1) 
 Syracuse – 41
 Boston College – 20
 NC State – 17

Coastal Division poll

 North Carolina – 69 (9)
 Virginia – 58 (2)
 Notre Dame – 51 (1)
 Virginia Tech – 31
 Duke – 28
 Pittsburgh – 15

Regular season 

All times Eastern time.

Week 1 (Aug 21–27) 
Schedule and results:

Players of the week:

Week 2 (Aug 28 – Sep 3) 
Schedule and results:

Players of the week:

Week 3 (Sep 4–10) 
Schedule and results:

Players of the week:

Week 4 (Sep 11–17) 
Schedule and results:

Players of the week:

Week 5 (Sep 18–24) 
Schedule and results:

Players of the week:

Week 6 (Sep 25 – Oct 1) 
Schedule and results:

Players of the week:

Week 7 (Oct 2–8) 
Schedule and results:

Players of the week:

Week 8 (Oct 9–15) 
Schedule and results:

Players of the week:

Week 9 (Oct 16–22) 
Schedule and results:

Players of the week:

Week 10 (Oct 23–29) 
Schedule and results:

Players of the week:

Week 11 (Oct 30 – Nov 5) 
Schedule and results:

Note: Rankings shown are seedings from ACC tournament

Week 12 (Nov 6 – Nov 12) 
Schedule and results:

Note: Rankings shown are seedings from ACC tournament

Rankings

United Soccer

Top Drawer Soccer

Postseason

ACC tournament

NCAA tournament

Nine teams from the Atlantic Coast Conference were selected to participate in the NCAA tournament.  Nine teams tied the record for most number of teams from a single conference in the tournament.  The record of nine was achieved in 2016, also by the ACC.  For the second straight year, seven ACC teams were seeded and received a first round bye in the tournament.  The ACC now holds the top three spots for most teams from a conference.  The ACC had eight teams invited in 2005.  This is the seventeenth consecutive year that at least five teams from the ACC have earned an NCAA bid. All rankings shown in the table below are tournament seeds.

Awards

Postseason awards

All-ACC awards and teams

The ACC announced award winners on November 7, 2017.  All awards were voted on by the league's head coaches.

All-Americans

College Soccer News 
Six ACC players were named All-Americans by CollegeSoccerNews.com

Soccer America 
Seven ACC players were named All-Americans by Soccer America on December 8 .

United Soccer Coaches 

On December 7, 2017, United Soccer Coaches announced their All-America teams, broken into three starting XI's. Seven ACC players were named All-America by USC.

National awards 
 Hermann Trophy: Jon Bakero
 Senior CLASS Award: Jon Bakero

MLS SuperDraft

Total picks by school

List of selections

Homegrown contracts

References 

 
2017 NCAA Division I men's soccer season